Seh Chekan-e Meleh Shahi (also Romanized as Seh Chekān-e Meleh Shāhī; also known as Malekshāhī, Meleh Shāhī, and Seh Chekān) is a village in Jalalvand Rural District, Firuzabad District, Kermanshah County, Kermanshah Province, Iran. At the 2006 census, its population was 289, in 61 families.

References 

Populated places in Kermanshah County